William Perkins or Parkyns (c.1400-c.1449) was an English landowner and Member of Parliament.

Biography

Perkins was the first of his family to arrive in Berkshire where he held the manor of Ufton Robert. In his early years William was a bailiff to Prince Humphrey, Duke of Gloucester. When William married his wife Margaret Colney in 1424, he made an agreement with John and Elizabeth Colney. This agreement gave his in-laws William and his wife the property of Ufton Manor in return for an 8 marks of silver per year to Elizabeth Colney after William's death. This agreement seems to shows that William was related to Elizabeth Colney and many scholars have speculated that Elizabeth and Margaret were sisters. In 1427, and several years after, William Perkins served as Escheator for the counties of Berkshire and Oxfordshire. In 1435 the union between the parishes of Ufton Robert and Ufton Nervet was William's most successful achievement. This union created the modern day village of Ufton and allowed his children to hold the patronage of the combined living.

He represented Berkshire (UK Parliament constituency) in Parliament in 1421-22, 1429, 1432, and 1435.

Family
William Perkins was the son of John Perkins and his wife of an unknown name. He married a woman named Margaret in 1424 and had one known son.

Thomas Perkins (1397-1478)

References

1400 births
1449 deaths
English MPs 1422
English MPs 1429
English MPs 1432
English MPs 1435